The discography of American singer-songwriter Phoebe Bridgers consists of two studio albums, nine extended plays, 20 singles, six promotional singles, and 12 music videos. She has also released one extended play as part of Sloppy Jane, two extended plays as a part of Boygenius, and one studio album as part of Better Oblivion Community Center.

Studio albums

Extended plays

Singles

As lead artist

As featured artist

Promotional singles

Other charted songs

Guest appearances

Songwriting and production credits

Music videos

As part of other groups

Sloppy Jane

Demo albums
Totally Limbless (2014)
Burger Radio (2014)
Extended plays
Sure-Tuff (2015)

Boygenius

Studio albums
  The Record (2023)
Extended plays
Boygenius (2018)
Boygenius Demos (2020)

Better Oblivion Community Center

Better Oblivion Community Center (2019, with Conor Oberst)

Notes

References

Discographies of American artists
Folk music discographies
Rock music discographies